"" (original: "", English: "Savior of the nations, come", literally: Now come, Saviour of the heathen) is a Lutheran chorale of 1524 with words written by Martin Luther, based on  by Ambrose, and a melody, Zahn 1174, based on its plainchant. It was printed in the Erfurt Enchiridion of 1524.

The song was the prominent hymn for the first Sunday of Advent for centuries. It was used widely in organ settings by Protestant Baroque composers, most notably Johann Sebastian Bach, who also composed two church cantatas beginning with the hymn. Later settings include works by Max Reger, Brian Easdale and Siegfried Strohbach.

English versions include "Savior of the nations, come" by William Morton Reynolds, published in 1851.

History
Martin Luther wrote the text of "" possibly for the Advent of 1523 as a paraphrase of a passage, from the Latin Christmas hymn "Intende qui reges Israel" by Ambrose. Several Latin versions begin with "Veni redemptor gentium", in similarity to hymns such as "Veni Creator Spiritus". The themes from the 4th century are the humanity and divinity of Christ, as testified by his birth by the Virgin Mary. Luther wrote the hymn at the end of 1523 in a period when he wrote many hymn texts, mostly psalm paraphrases and some free poems, such as "Nun freut euch, lieben Christen g'mein". He paraphrased the seven stanzas of the Latin hymn rather closely, and added a doxology as an eighth stanza. He seems to have been more interested in keeping the traditional text than fluent German, possibly to demonstrate his closeness to the traditional theology, in contrast to a translation by Thomas Müntzer, who followed his own theology.

The melody, Zahn 1174, was composed by Luther and possibly Johann Walter, based on the original plainchant melodies, such as a 12th-century version from Einsiedeln. The hymn was printed in the Erfurt Enchiridion in 1524, and was also published the same year in Walter's choral Wittenberg hymnal, Eyn geystlich Gesangk Buchleyn. In several hymnals, the hymn opens the collection, such as Klug's Gesangbuch (1529 and 1533), the Babstsches Gesangbuch (1545), and continuing to the Evangelisches Kirchengesangbuch (EKG) of 1950, which retained five of the eight stanzas. In other hymnals, the hymn opened the section related to the liturgical year, such as in Johann Crüger's Praxis Pietatis Melica. In the 1995 Evangelisches Gesangbuch it is EG 4, again in five stanzas.

Johann Sebastian Bach arranged the cantata during his career (BWV 699). There have been many variations of Bach's arrangement. One of the most respected solo instrumental versions is one by Ferruccio Busoni, in his Bach-Busoni Editions.  One regular performer of this arrangement was Vladimir Horowitz.

Theme and text
The song, in eight stanzas of four lines each, expresses first the request for the coming of a redeemer of all people, including the heathens or gentiles, born of a virgin. It reflects his origin from the Father, to whom he will return after going to Hell. The last stanza is a doxology, translating a medieval appendix to Ambrose's hymn. The following shows the Latin original, Luther's translation with numbers given to the five stanzas by Luther contained in the 1995 Evangelisches Gesangbuch, and an English translation by William Morton Reynolds, "Savior of the nations, come", published in 1851.

Melody and musical settings
Luther derived the melody from the Latin hymn's medieval plainchant melodies, making changes to accommodate the more accented German. His major achievement was to repeat the first melodic line in the last, forming an ABCA structure and transforming the medieval hymn into a Lutheran chorale.

The chorale was used as the prominent hymn for the first Sunday of Advent for centuries. It was used widely in organ settings by Protestant Baroque composers, including Johann Pachelbel and, most notably Johann Sebastian Bach, who set it as the opening chorale prelude (BWV 599) of the Orgelbüchlein and three times—as BWV 659 (one of his best known organ compositions), BWV 660 and BWV 661—in his Great Eighteen Chorale Preludes.

Georg Böhm set all eight stanzas of the hymn in a cantata Nun komm, der Heiden Heiland for soloists, choir and instruments. Bach used the hymn in two church cantatas for the first Sunday of Advent, his chorale cantata  (1724) and in the opening chorale fantasia of his earlier cantata  (1714). Max Reger composed a setting as No. 29 of his 52 Chorale Preludes, Op. 67 in 1902.

"" continues to be used in modern settings. It appears in liturgically oriented Christian hymnals, for example the Lutheran Book of Worship, and as the cantus firmus for organ compositions. In Brian Easdale's score for the 1948 film The Red Shoes, the melody from the chorale is heard as a theme late in the ballet, punctuated by ringing bells, brass instruments and a grand piano. Siegfried Strohbach composed a choral setting in 1988.

References

Bibliography

Books

Online sources

External links

 
 Luke Dahn: BWV 62.6 bach-chorales.com
 Heinz Jansen: Nun komm, der Heiden Heiland (in German) Protestant Church in Baden
 C. Michael Hawn: History of Hymns: “Savior of the Nations, Come” umcdiscipleship.org
 Joachim Grabinski: Intende qui regis Israel / Veni redemptor gentium / Nun komm, der Heiden Heiland (in German) grabinski-online.de
 Fritz Wagner: 'Veni redemptor gentium'- Ein Weihnachtshymnus des Ambrosius von Mailand. (in German) In: Pegasus 3 / 2002, 1.

16th-century hymns in German
Songs about Jesus
Hymn tunes
Hymns by Martin Luther
Advent songs